Joey Skaggs (born 1945) is an American prankster who has organized numerous successful media pranks, hoaxes, and other presentations. Skaggs is one of the originators of the phenomenon known as culture jamming. Skaggs has used Kim Yung Soo, Joe Bones, Joseph Bonuso, Giuseppe Scaggioli, Dr. Joseph Gregor, and the Rev. Anthony Joseph as aliases.

Artistic career
In his youth, Skaggs studied at the High School of Art and Design and received a BFA from the School of Visual Arts in New York. Between 1966 and 1969, Skaggs organized crucifixion performances on Easter Sundays.

In 1968, Skaggs noticed that middle-class suburbanites were going on tours of the East Village to observe hippies. Skaggs subsequently organized a sightseeing tour for hippies to observe the suburbs of Queens. On Christmas Day, he created the Vietnamese Christmas Nativity Burning to protest against the Vietnam War.

In 1969, Skaggs tied a 50-foot bra to the front of the U.S. Treasury building on Wall Street in protest against Francine Gottfried's street harassment, organized a Hells Angels' wedding procession through the Lower East Side, and made a grotesque Statue of Liberty on July 4, again to protest against the Vietnam War.

In 1971, Skaggs bought Earlville Opera House, which is now a thriving performance and exhibition center. In the same year, he organized what he called a Fame Exchange during the New York Avant Garde Festival, where he hired a group of admirers to follow him around instead of John Lennon and Yoko Ono. It was a forerunner for his next pranks.

According to his web site, Skaggs does not care for "vicious" pranks such as letters containing fake anthrax; he also states that he is not doing anything illegal. He uses volunteer actors to play his customers, refusing to really scam anyone except the media. Often the prank is launched with nothing more than a press release with a phone number; in these press releases, Skaggs leaves hints or details that easily could be checked for accuracy. Eventually, he reveals the hoax to make his point.

On some occasions, Skaggs has sent a substitute to interviews with programs such as Entertainment Tonight and To Tell the Truth. Producers did not notice. Also, photographs in the National Enquirer and Playback have depicted the wrong man.

Many of Skaggs's pranks are originally reported as true in various news media. Sometimes the stories are retracted.

When not pranking the media, Skaggs earns his living by painting, making sculptures and lecturing.

In a 2015 interview, Skaggs revealed that he has a hoax that is "out there" that no one has discovered yet. After the interview, Chinese news agency SinoVision promptly fell for his then 30-year-old annual New York City April Fools' Day parade hoax and ran a four-minute segment in English on the non-event.

In 2017, "Art of the Prank", Andrea Marini's award-winning feature documentary about artist Joey Skaggs, was released internationally on television and streaming platforms.

In 2020, production began on a series of short oral history documentaries featuring Skaggs and materials from his archive titled, “Joey Skaggs Satire and Art Activism, 1960s to the Present and Beyond”. <ref>Justin Almodovar, Joey Skaggs: Fish Condos screens at the Spring 2022 New Jersey Film Festival on February 11, in newjerseystage.com, Feb.10, 2022</ref>

Select pranks

 Cathouse for Dogs (1976): Skaggs published an ad for a dog brothel in The Village Voice and hired actors to present their dogs for the benefit of an ABC news crew. The prank annoyed the ASPCA and the Bureau of Animal Affairs until Skaggs revealed the truth after a subpoena. ABC did not retract the story (the WABC TV producer insisted that Skaggs had said it was a hoax to avoid prosecution), possibly because the piece won an Emmy Award.
 Celebrity Sperm Bank (1976): Skaggs organized a sperm bank auction in New York; the sperm bank was then robbed and semen was supposedly taken hostage.
 Wall Street Shoeshine (1979): Skaggs played Joseph Bucks, a shoeshine man who had become rich on Wall Street and was working his last day—at $5 a shine.
 Metamorphosis (1981): Skaggs played Dr. Gregor, inventor of the Cockroach Vitamin Pill, which was supposed to be a cure-all drug. It was a nod to Franz Kafka's story "The Metamorphosis".
 Gypsies Against Stereotypical Propaganda (1982): Gypsy King JoJo (played by Skaggs) led a protest demanding that the Gypsy moth's name be changed because it was demeaning to his people.
 Windsurfing from Hawaii to California (1983): Windsurfer J.J. Skaggs attempted the first crossing of the Pacific Ocean on a sailboard.
 Fish Condos (1983): Skaggs created an aquarium depicting rooms with furniture. It was meant to satirize gentrification, but the aquariums sold very well.
 Bad Guys Talent Management Agency (1984): In an attempt to get an acting job for a friend, Verne Williams, Skaggs founded a fictitious management agency for "bad-guy" actors. Eventually even real studios and wannabe actors contacted him.
 WALK RIGHT!  (1984): Skaggs put together a fictitious militant group that wanted to enforce proper street walking etiquette and make its rules into law.
 The Fat Squad (1986): Skaggs played Joe Bones, the founder of a disciplinarian diet program where musclemen watched the customers 24 hours a day to make sure they stuck to their diets, at a cost of $300 a day.
 1986 was also the first year of the Annual April Fools' Day Parade; it exists only as press release and is announced and promoted every year.
 Save the Geoduck Campaign (1987): Skaggs played Dr. Richard J. Long who sought to save geoduck mollusks from extinction because they had become a popular aphrodisiac among the Japanese.
 Comacocoon (1990): As Dr. Joseph Schlafer, Skaggs offered a literal dream vacation—customers were to sleep in a cocoon, enjoying programmed dreams about the vacation. The Department of Consumer Affairs was alerted.
 Hair Today, Ltd. (1990): Joseph Chenango—another Skaggs character—marketed a new kind of hair implant: whole scalps from the dead. The prank began as an ad in the Village Voice'' soliciting scalp donors.
 Geraldo Hoax (1991): Skaggs appeared on Geraldo Rivera's TV talk show and told a story about New York artists living in water towers—which he had not done.
 Brooklyn Bridge Lottery (1992): Skaggs released a "leak" informing the public of a lottery where the first prize would be renaming rights to the Brooklyn Bridge.
 Portofess (1992): Skaggs played Father Anthony Joseph, appearing with a portable confession booth at the Democratic National Convention.
 Sex Tapes Saved Marriage (1993): Skaggs sent two actors to Faith Daniels' show to claim that sex tapes had saved their marriage.
 SEXONIX (1993): Skaggs created a hoax about a sex machine, claiming that the prototype had been seized by Canada Customs at the Canada–US border on its way from the United States. He used his own name. Uproar ensued in various bulletin boards.
 The Psychic Attorney (1994): On April 1, Skaggs appeared as Maqdananda, a combined New Age telephone psychic and lawyer. His voice mail box was flooded with calls.
 Dog Meat Soup (1994): Skaggs portrayed Kim Yung Soo, an entrepreneur who wanted to purchase unwanted dogs for human consumption. His purpose was to bring to light issues of cultural bias, intolerance and racism, as well as to demonstrate the media's tendency to be reactionary, gullible and irresponsible. 
 Baba Wa Simba (1995): Skaggs appeared in London as Baba Wa Simba, a therapist who recommended that participants roar and behave like lions (reminiscent of primal scream therapy).
 The Solomon Project (1995): Joseph Bonuso (Skaggs) claimed to have created a computer program that would work as both judge and jury and announce sentences. It pronounced O. J. Simpson guilty.
 STOP BioPEEP (1998): Skaggs appeared as Dr. Joseph Howard, supposed employee of an Australian company, and revealed surreptitious genetic engineering with poultry to create addictive commercial products.
 Doody Rudy (1999): Skaggs created a large satirical portrait of New York mayor Rudy Giuliani and let people throw fake elephant dung at it, in response to Giuliani's criticism of an artwork by Chris Ofili that incorporated real elephant dung.
 The Final Curtain (2000): Skaggs' creation was a combined funeral company, virtual graveyard and theme park. It was meant to satirize showmanship in places like Forest Lawn cemeteries. Some investors were actually interested. Final Curtain's website is still functioning.
 Art Attack (2002): Espai D'Art Contemporani (EACC) in Castellon, Spain asked Skaggs to organize a presentation; in response, Skaggs created a computer game where people could shoot passersby walking past the building in the outside corridor.
 Bush! (2004): Dressed as Uncle Sam and flanked by cheerleaders, flag bearers, Cabinet members, the Saudi Royal Family and Secret Service operatives, Skaggs pedaled a large replica of the White House, with then-President George W. Bush inside on the toilet, into Washington Square Park on Independence Day.
 Bullshit Detector Watch (2006): Skaggs created a satirical product, a watch that flashes, moos and poops. It also tells time.
 Art of the Prank blog (2007): Skaggs launched a blog covering news, insights, and discussions on everything to do with unsanctioned art, pranks, hoaxes, culture jamming and reality hacking.
 Mobile Homeless Homes (2012): Pedaling his Mobile Homeless Home, a shelter made from connected garbage cans, Skaggs led a group of angry muppets through the streets of New York to bring their outrage against greedy financial institutions and failed government oversight to the public.
 Santa's Missile Tow (2012): Skaggs as Santa Claus, armed with a mobile rocket launcher mounted on the back of a tricycle, targeted the United Nations and Times Square with a sign proclaiming "World Peace or Else!". He was accompanied by an army of elves handing out toy soldiers to passersby.
 Bigfoot & The Tiny Top Circus (2014): Bigfoot, the world's most illusive and terrifying creature, was captured and put on display by the Tiny Top Circus in New York City's Washington Square Park. The creature (Joey Skaggs dressed literally as a big foot) made a daring escape and disappeared into the West Fourth Street subway station.
 Trump's Golden Throne (2017): For New York City's 32nd annual April Fools' Day Parade, after 31 years promoting a parade that didn't exist, Joey Skaggs orchestrated a real one. He held a Trumpathon, the world's largest gathering of Trump look-alikes, and together they paraded a golden outhouse, featuring President Donald Trump tweeting on his phone as he sat on his throne, to Trump Tower on 5th Avenue.
 Trump's Military Parade (2018): Joey Skaggs' 33rd Annual April Fools' Day Parade featured a mockery of Trump's proposed Military Parade, with Donald Trump look-alikes carrying an arsenal of toy weapons. They were joined by North Korean "Rocket Man" Kim Jong Un and Russian President Vladimir Putin look-alikes as they marched down Fifth Avenue to Trump Tower.

See also
Alan Abel, another American performer of media hoaxes including the Society for Indecency to Naked Animals (SINA)

References

External links
 
 The Art of the Prank
 RE/Search Interview with Joey Skaggs
 

1945 births
20th-century American writers
21st-century American writers
Living people
Hoaxers]
Writers from New York (state)
High School of Art and Design alumni
School of Visual Arts alumni
20th-century American male writers
Culture jamming